James Frederick Kittson MM (26 November 1891 – 17 October 1971) was an Australian politician.

He was born in Greenwald to farmer John Frederick Kittson and Marion Remfry. He attended state school at Heywood and worked briefly at the Boolarra Butter Factory before serving in the 8th Battalion during the First World War. He was awarded the Military Medal. On 21 August 1915 he married Minnie Birch, with whom he had one son.

After the war, he became secretary of the Cobden Butter Factory, and from 1919 business manager for the Wallace Millbrook and Buninyong Butter Company. He became director of the butter company in 1942. In 1946 he was elected to the Victorian Legislative Council for Ballarat Province, representing the Liberal Party. He was defeated in 1952. Kittson retained the directorship of his company until his retirement in 1970, and died at Ballarat in 1971.

References

1891 births
1971 deaths
Australian Army officers
Australian military personnel of World War I
Australian recipients of the Military Medal
Liberal Party of Australia members of the Parliament of Victoria
Members of the Victorian Legislative Council
20th-century Australian politicians